Karan-e Vasat (also Romanized as Karān-e Vasaṭ; also known as Shahrābād, Karān-e Mīānī and Kerān-e Mīānī) is a village in Baba Jik Rural District, in the Central District of Chaldoran County, West Azerbaijan Province, Iran. At the 2006 census, its population was 57, in 11 families.

References 

Populated places in Chaldoran County